Crown of Thorns is the debut solo studio album by American rapper Rakaa, a member of the Dilated Peoples crew. It was released on Decon in 2010. The cover art was painted by Doze Green. The album peaked at number 72 on the Billboard Top R&B/Hip-Hop Albums chart.

Critical reception

Chris Faraone of The Phoenix gave the album 3.5 stars out of 4, writing, "A couple of dud throwbacks briefly interrupt, but otherwise Rakaa has painted the sort of edgeless canvas that even the most eclectic acts are scared to make these days." Scott Morrow of Alarm described the album as "a straightforward, original disc of hip-hop jams with a diversity of samples and sounds, whether they're hard-hitting, funky, or jazzy." Brett Uddenberg of URB gave the album 3 stars out of 5, stating, "While the solo record is an extension of what he has accomplished with his group, it is unlikely to spawn any memorable hits." He added, "The beats are excellent and the flow is solid, but there's something missing here."

HipHopDX included it on the "Top 25 Albums of 2010" list.

Track listing

Charts

References

External links
 

2010 debut albums
Rakaa albums
Decon albums
Albums produced by the Alchemist (musician)
Albums produced by El-P
Albums produced by Evidence (musician)
Albums produced by Exile (producer)
Albums produced by Illmind
Albums produced by DJ Honda
Albums produced by Oh No (musician)